Orsolina Montevecchi (18 March 1911 – 1 February 2009) was an Italian papyrologist.

Life and career 
Montevecchi was born in Gambettola, Forlì-Cesena. She graduated from the Università Cattolica del Sacro Cuore with a thesis on sociological research in the papyri from Graeco-Roman Egypt. Since 1950, she has worked as a lecturer and then as a professor at the Università Cattolica del Sacro Cuore, where she spent the rest of her career. She was the author of numerous publications on the topic of Graeco-Roman Egypt, sociological studies in papyrology and provenance studies.

She was also the chief editor of Italian journal of Egyptology and papyrology, Aegyptus (1969–2002) and a member of the Association Internationale de Papyrologues (AIP). She died in Milan in 2009, aged 97.

References 

1911 births
2009 deaths
People from Gambettola
Italian papyrologists
Italian women archaeologists
Università Cattolica del Sacro Cuore alumni
Academic staff of the Università Cattolica del Sacro Cuore